Ryan Lee Strausborger (born March 4, 1988) is an American former professional baseball left fielder. He played in Major League Baseball (MLB) for Texas Rangers.

Career
Strausborger played college baseball at Indiana State University; where he was thrice a 1st team, 'All-MVC player; he ranks among the career leaders in most offensive categories for the Indiana State Sycamores.

Texas Rangers
He was drafted by the Texas Rangers in the 16th round of the 2010 Major League Baseball Draft. He made his professional debut with the Low-A Spokane Indians. He spent the 2011 season with the High-A Myrtle Beach Pelicans, slashing .270/.347/.416 in 126 games. In 2012, Strausborger played for the Double-A Frisco RoughRiders, slashing .247/.309/.474 with 6 home runs and 46 RBI. Strausborger remained in Frisco for the 2013 season, batting .217/.286/.347 in 133 games. He split the next season between Frisco and the Triple-A Round Rock Express, where he hit .274/.330/.407 between the two teams.

Strausborger was called up to the majors for the first time on August 4, 2015 and made his MLB debut the next day, going hitless in two at-bats. Strausborger hit .200/.240/.267 in 31 major league games before he was outrighted off of the 40-man roster on October 21, 2015. He was assigned to Triple-A Round Rock to begin the 2016 season.

Seattle Mariners
On July 5, 2016, Strausborger was acquired by the Seattle Mariners from the Rangers in exchange for an International Bonus slot. He finished the season with the Triple-A Tacoma Rainiers, batting .153/.244/.225 before electing free agency on November 7.

Minnesota Twins
On March 30, 2017, Strausborger signed a minor league contract with the Minnesota Twins and was assigned to the Triple-A Rochester Red Wings. Strausborger minimally played between Rochester and the Double-A Chattanooga Lookouts due to injury, and was released on August 10, 2017. He was released on August 10, 2017. He resigned a minor league deal on August 29, 2017.  He appeared in 41 games, and batted an underwhelming .224 between the two clubs before electing free agency on November 6, 2017.

Southern Maryland Blue Crabs
On March 28, 2018, Strausborger signed with the Southern Maryland Blue Crabs of the independent Atlantic League of Professional Baseball. He became a free agent following the 2018 season.

References

External links

Indiana State Sycamores bio

1988 births
Living people
People from Elkhart, Indiana 
Baseball players from Indiana
Major League Baseball outfielders
Texas Rangers players
Indiana State Sycamores baseball players
Spokane Indians players
Myrtle Beach Pelicans players
Surprise Saguaros players
Frisco RoughRiders players
Round Rock Express players
Tacoma Rainiers players
Chattanooga Lookouts players
Rochester Red Wings players
Southern Maryland Blue Crabs players